Heronvale (also known informally as Brisk Bay) is a coastal town in the Whitsunday Region, Queensland, Australia. It is within the locality of Bowen.

Geography 
Heronvale is on the south-east coast of the locality of Bowen facing Brisk Bay and Edgecumbe Bay.

History 
Edgecumbe Bay was named on 4 June 1770 by Lieutenant James Cook on HM Bark Endeavour after George Edgcumbe who had a distinguished career in the Royal Navy and, as a Rear Admiral, was Commander in Chief at Plymouth, England, from 1766 to 1770.

Brisk Bay was named after HMS Brisk on service at the  Australia Station from 1864 to 1968.

The town was named on 1 November 1963 by the Queensland Place Names Board.

Education 
There are no schools in Heronvale. The nearest government primary and secondary schools are Bowen State School and Bowen State High School in Bowen to the north-west.

References

External links 
 

Whitsunday Region
Towns in Queensland
Coastline of Queensland